Wandile Makwetu (born 7 January 1999) is a South African cricketer. He made his first-class debut for Northerns Districts in the 2017–18 Sunfoil 3-Day Cup on 1 March 2018. Prior to his first-class debut, he was named in South Africa's squad for the 2018 Under-19 Cricket World Cup.

Makwetu made his List A debut for Northerns in the 2017–18 CSA Provincial One-Day Challenge on 4 March 2018.

In June 2018, Makwetu was named in the squad for the Titans team for the 2018–19 season. In August 2018, he was awarded a senior contract by Cricket South Africa ahead of the 2018–19 domestic season. In December 2019, in the 2019–20 CSA 4-Day Franchise Series, he scored his maiden first-class century.

In April 2021, Makwetu was named in the South Africa Emerging Men's squad for their six-match tour of Namibia. Later the same month, he was named in Free State's squad, ahead of the 2021–22 cricket season in South Africa.

References

External links
 

1999 births
Living people
South African cricketers
Northerns cricketers
Place of birth missing (living people)
Free State cricketers